Franco Fontana (born 9 December 1933) is an Italian photographer. He is best known for his abstract colour landscapes.

Biography 
Franco Fontana was born in 1933 in Modena. He started taking photographs in the 1950s when he was working as a decorator in a furniture showroom. In 1961 he joined a local amateur club in Modena. The experience would be a turning point in his career, and Fontana went on to have his first solo exhibition in 1965 at the Società Fotografica Subalpina, Turin and at the Galleria della Sala di Cultura in Modena in 1968. Since then he has participated in more than 400 group and solo exhibitions.

Fontana has photographed for advertising campaigns for brands such as Fiat, Volkswagen, Ferrovie dello Stato Italiane, Snam, Sony, Volvo, Versace, Canon, Kodak, Robe di Kappa, Swissair, and has been a magazine photographer for publications including Time, Life, Vogue (USA and France), Venerdì di Repubblica, Panorama, and with the Frankfurter Allgemeine Zeitung and The New York Times.

Fontana's first book, Skyline, was published in 1978 in France by Contrejour and in Italy by Punto e Virgola with a text by Helmut Gernsheim.

Fontana is the art director of the Toscana Fotofestival.

He has received numerous awards, such as the 1989 Tokyo Photographer Society of Japan - The 150 Years of Photography - Photographer Award.

Style and Critical Reception
Fontana is especially interested in the interplay of colours. His early innovations in colour photography in the 1960s were stylistically disruptive. According to art critic Giuliana Scimé, Fontana "destroyed all the structures, practices, and technical choices within the Italian tradition." 
Fontana uses 35mm cameras, and as noted by Iwan Zahar, deploys distant viewpoints with telephoto lenses to flatten contours in a landscape of crops and fields into bands of intense, saturated colour. This is an effect that Franco Lefèvre has described as 'dialectical landscapism'. Of his use of colour in his 2019 retrospective exhibition Sintesi ('Synthesis') at Fondazione Modena Arti Visive, curator Diana Baldon has observed;

“His bold geometric compositions are characterised by shimmering colours, level perspectives and a geometric-formalist and minimal language...By adopting this approach during the 1960s, Fontana injected a new vitality into the field of creative colour photography for then multicolour was not in fashion in art photography...The way Fontana shoots, dematerialises the objects photographed, which loose three-dimensionality and realism to become part of an abstract drawing”.

Aside from the rural landscape Fontana has applied his graphic sensibility to other subjects: city architecture, portraiture, fashion, still-life and the nude.

Fontana's photographs have also been used as album cover art for records produced by the ECM Records jazz label.

Permanent collections 

Art Gallery of New South Wales, Sydney 
George Eastman Museum, Rochester, New York
The Israel Museum
Kemper Art Museum
Museum of Fine Arts, Houston
Amon Carter Museum of American Art
Rose Art Museum
George Eastman Museum
Williams College Museum of Art
Minneapolis Institute of Art
Princeton University Art Museum
National Museum, Beijing
Stedelijk Museum Amsterdam
Tokyo Photographic Art Museum
Galleria Civica d'Arte Moderna e Contemporanea di Latina
Turin Civic Gallery of Modern and Contemporary Art
University of Michigan Museum of Art
Victoria and Albert Museum, London

Publications 
Modena una città, text by Pier Paolo Preti, Ruggeri, Modena 1970
Terra da leggere, text by Pier Paolo Preti, IKS editrice, Modena 1974
Bologna, Il volto della città, text by Pier Luigi Cervellati, Ricardo Franco Levi Editore, Modena 1975
Laggiù gli uomini, text by Enzo Biagi, Ricardo Franco Levi Editore, Modena 1976
Sky-line, text by Helmut Gernsheim, Punto e Virgola, Modena e Contrejour, Paris 1978
Presenze veneziane, text by Achille Bonito Oliva e Angelo Schwarz, Maurizio Rossi Editore, Modena 1979
Paesaggio urbano, text by Angelo Schwarz, Selezione d’Immagini, Milan 1980
Presenza-Assenza, text by Giuliana Scimé, Selezione d’Immagini, Milan 1982
I grandi fotografi, text by Achille Bonito Oliva e Giuliana Scimé, Fabbri Editori, Milan 1983
Full Color, text by Guy Mandery, Contrejour, Paris 1983
I primi dieci ristoranti e alberghi d’Italia, texts by Giovanni Agnelli e Giovanni Nuvoletti, La chiave d’oro Editrice, Modena 1983
Los Grandes Fotografos, Ediciones Orbis, Barcelona 1983
Capire domani 1933-1983, Edizione Stet, Florence 1983
Meisterfotos Gestalten, text by Pier Paolo Preti, Verlag Laterna Magica, Munich 1983
Piscina, Diapress, Milan 1984
EU 42, text by Paolo Portoghesi, Rondanini, Rome 1984
Franco Fontana, Nippon Geijutsu, Tokyo 1984
I dogi della moda, Associazione Comitato Veneziamoda, 1984
Disney World Epcot Center, text by Roy Disney, Edizioni Panini, Modena 1986
Lui lavora lì, text by Liborio Termine, Edizioni Panini, Modena 1986
Università Oggi, Edizione Opere Universitarie, Rome, 1986
San Marino e il gioco delle apparenze, text by Sergio zavoli, Cassa di Risparmio di RSM, San Marino, 1986
Imola Imola, text by Aureliano Bassani, Edizioni Cerim, Imola, 1987
Franco Fontana, text by Giuliana Scimé, Umberto Allemandi Editore, Turin, 1987
Franco Fontana, Rebecchi, Modena, 1988
Il corpo scoperto. Il nudo in fotografia, text by Daniela Palazzoli, Idea Books, Milan 1988
L’universo nel piatto, Rebecchi, Modena, 1989
I nudi di Franco Fontana in Polaroid, text by Liborio Termine, Aleph, Turin, 1989
Invito a Bologna, text by Athos Vianelli, Magnus, Udine 1989
Il carnevale di Viareggio, text by Alberto Bevilacqua, Mondadori Arte, Milan, 1989
Kaleidoscope, text by Christian Caujolle e Franco Lefèvre, Edizioni Arte, Udine, 1990
Franco Fontana è venuto una volta a Torino e l’ha vista così, Rebecchi, Modena, 1990
Sakura, sogni paralleli, Cassa di Risparmi di Vignola, 1990
40 immagine inedite di Franco Fontana, text by Mauro Corradini e Giandomenico Semeraro, Edizione del Museo Ken Damy, Brescia, 1990
Modena Effetto Notte, Graphis, Bologna, 1990
Viaggio in Sicilia, Graphis, Bologna, 1992
Modena effetto notte, Graphis, Bologna, 1992
Universo nel piatto 2, Graphis, Bologna, 1993
Aemilia, text by Candido Bonvicini, Edizioni Biblos, Padua 1993
Landscape moments, Rebecchi, Modena, 1994
Franco Fontana, text by Flaminio Gualdoni, Federico Motta Editore, Milan, 1994
Le ricette erotiche, text by G. Bolognesi, Graphis, Bologna, 1995
Franco Fontana Landscape, edizione limitata a cento copie, Ken Damy Polimedia, Brescia, 1996
100 fiori, simboli, messaggi di libertà, text by Lello Piazza, Mondadori, Milan, 1997
Janua Urbis, A. Pizzi, 1997
Polaroid, text by Francesco Guccini, Motta Fotografia, Milan, 1997
Modena ieri e oggi, text by Michele Smargiassi, Associazione Giuseppe Panini, Modena, 1998
Franco Fontana antologica, text by Giorgio Cortenova e Walter Guadagnini, Leonardo Arte, Milan, 2000
Sorpresi nella luce americana, text by Giampiero Mughini, Federico Motta Editore, Milan, 2000
Emerging Bodies Collezione Polaroid, Edizioni Stemmle, Zurich, 2000
Emilia Romagna da gustare, text by Antonio Piccinardi, Giorgio Mondadori Editore, Milan, 2000
Il paesaggio che verrà, text by Piero Angela e Giuseppe Pederiali, Panini, Modena 2000
Historic Route 66, with Valerio Massimo Manfredi, Skira, Milan, 2002
Franco Fontana, a cura di Giovanna Calvenzi, testo di Massimo Mussini, Federico Motta Editore, Milan, 2003
Paesaggio, with Mario Giacomelli, text by Federico Zeri,  Edizioni Gribaudo, Asti, 2003
Antiche penombre in controluce, Franco Cosimo Panini Editore, Modena, 2003
Retrospettiva, text by Allan D. Coleman e Giuliana Scimé, Edizioni Logos, Modena, 2003
Appia Regina viarum, text by Valerio Massimo Manfredi, Trnsmec, 2003
Paesaggi con Andrea Micheli Galleria degli animali, text by Renato Barilli e Giorgio Celli, Mazzotta Editore, Milan, 2005
Appunti siciliani, text by Liborio Termine e Gianni Riotta, Federico Motta Editore, Milan,  2006
La via Emilia, text by Francesco Guccini e Valerio Massimo Manfredi, Atlante, Bazzano, 2006
Il tempo fissato. Pietre e colori a Morgantina, text by Vincenzo Consolo e Liborio Termine, Ed. Università Kore, 2006
Alassio, Comune di Alassio, 2008
Fabbriche di sassi, with Luigi Ottani, Anna Prandi, Edizioni Artestampa, Modena, 2008
Modena effetto notte, reloaded, Ed. italiana e inglese, Edizioni Artestampa, Modena, 2009
Paesaggi a confronto, Edizioni Artestampa, Modena, 2010
Donne, Franco Cosimo Panini Editore, Modena, 2010
Grandi autori, Fotografia contemporanea, edited by Claudio Pastrone, Fiaf, Turin,  2011
L’anima un paesaggio interiore, text by Giorgio faletti e Liborio Termine, 24 Ore Cultura, Gruppo 24 Ore, Milan, 2011
Skyline, texts by Claude Nori and Francesco Zanot, Contrasto due, Rome, 2013
Franco Fontana. A life of photos, Italian and English editions, Postcart, Rome, 2013
Bellezze Disarmoniche, Artestampa, 2014
Franco Fontana - FULL COLOR, Ediz. Marsilio, Venice, 2014
Vita Nova, Ediz. Sabrina Raffaghello, 2014
Vista d'Autore, Canon-EXPO, 2015
Terra Alma et Amara, 100 numbered copies signed with a poem by Valerio Massimo Manfredi, 2015
La Fotografia Creativa, Mondadori, Milan
Italia a Scatti Il Racconto di Grandi Fotografi, Electa, Milan

References

External links
Fontana's official website, Italy
Photos by Fontana from Robert Klein gallery
ArteF Fine Art Photography Gallery, Zürich

20th-century Italian photographers
20th-century Italian male artists
Italian contemporary artists
Living people
1933 births
Artists from Modena
21st-century Italian photographers
Italian photographers
21st-century Italian male artists
Commercial photographers
Landscape photographers